American Superconductor (AMSC) is an American energy technologies company based in Ayer, Massachusetts specializing in the design and manufacture of power systems and superconducting wire. 
It owns AMSC Windtech in Klagenfurt, Austria.

Projects

Detroit Edison Project
American Superconductor installed a test of a superconducting electric power transmission power cable in the Detroit Edison Frisbee substation in 2001.

Holbrook Superconductor Project 
The world's first production superconducting transmission power cable, the Holbrook Superconductor Project, was commissioned in late June 2008. The suburban Long Island electrical substation is fed by about 600 meters of high-temperature superconductor wire manufactured by American Superconductor, installed underground and chilled to superconducting temperatures with liquid nitrogen.

Tres Amigas Project 
American Superconductor was chosen as a supplier for the Tres Amigas Project, the United States' first renewable energy market hub. The Tres Amigas renewable energy market hub will be a multi-mile, triangular electricity pathway of Superconductor Electricity Pipelines capable of transferring and balancing many gigawatts of power between three U.S. power grids (the Eastern Interconnection, the Western Interconnection and the Texas Interconnection). Unlike traditional powerlines, it will transfer power as DC instead of AC current. It will be located in Clovis, New Mexico.

Korea's LS Cable 
AMSC will sell three million meters of wire to allow LS Cable to build 10–15 miles of superconducting cabling for the grid. This represents an order of magnitude increase over the size of the current largest installation, at Long Island Power.

HTS rotors
AMSC has demonstrated a 36.5 MW (49,000 horsepower) high-temperature superconductor (HTS) electric motor for the United States Navy, and is developing a similar 10 megawatt wind turbine generator through its wholly owned Austria-based subsidiary AMSC Windtec. This would be one of the world's most powerful turbines. It operates at 30–40 kelvins, and the cooling system uses 40 kW.

2009 government stimulus
In 2009, the Department of Energy announced that they would provide $4.8M to AMSC for further development of superconducting electrical cables.

Sinovel controversy
In early 2011, a Serbian employee of American Superconductor sold the company's proprietary wind turbine control software to the company's largest customer, China based Sinovel. Sinovel promptly ended its payments to American Superconductor, causing the company to lose 84% of its market cap. The employee was bribed for only $20,500, and later pleaded guilty to bribery charges.

References

External links 
American Superconductor website 

Superconductivity
Technology companies based in Massachusetts
Companies based in Ayer, Massachusetts
Energy companies established in 1987
Technology companies established in 1987
1978 establishments in Massachusetts
Companies listed on the Nasdaq